Tomoderus is a genus of antlike flower beetles in the family Anthicidae. There are about 200 described species in Tomoderus.

Species
These 12 species belong to the genus Tomoderus:

 Tomoderus abditus g
 Tomoderus bimaculatus Uhmann, 1988 g
 Tomoderus bosnicus Pic, 1892 g
 Tomoderus constrictus (Say, 1826) i c g b
 Tomoderus dalmatinus Reitter, 1881 g
 Tomoderus ehlersi von Heyden, 1882 g
 Tomoderus impressulus Casey, 1895 i c g
 Tomoderus inhabilis Werner, 1958 i c g
 Tomoderus interruptus LaFerté-Sénectère, 1849 i c g
 Tomoderus italicus De Marseul, 1879 g
 Tomoderus lineatopunctatus Uhmann, 1994 g
 Tomoderus piochardi von Heyden, 1871 g

Data sources: i = ITIS, c = Catalogue of Life, g = GBIF, b = Bugguide.net

References

Further reading

External links

 

Anthicidae
Articles created by Qbugbot